Rockin' You Eternally is an album by Leon Ware released in 1981. Self-produced by Ware, this was the first of two albums he released for Elektra Records.

Track listing
 A Little Boogie (Never Hurt No One) - (Leon Ware, Richard Rudolph)	4:30
 Baby Don't Stop Me - (Laudir de Oliveira, Leon Ware, Marcos Valle, Peter Cetera)	4:02
 Sure Do Want You Now - (Leon Ware, Richard Rudolph)	3:46
 Our Time - (Willie Beck, Clarence Willis, James Williams, Leon Ware, Richard Rudolph)	3:44
 Rockin' You Eternally - (Leon Ware, Marcos Valle)	4:21
 Got to Be Loved - (Leon Ware, Marcos Valle, Richard Rudolph)	3:49
 Don't Stay Away - (Leon Ware)	4:01
 In Our Garden	6:15 - (Leon Ware, Adrienne Anderson)

Personnel

 Leon Ware – lead and background vocals
 Marcos Valle – electric piano
 William Beck – electric piano & Piano
 Michael Boddicker – synthesizer
 Chet Willis – bass & guitar
 James "Diamond" Williams – drums
 Laudier DeOliveira – percussion
 Shadow  – background vocals
 Gene Page  – String and Horn Arrangements

References

External links
 

1981 albums
Leon Ware albums
Albums produced by Leon Ware
Elektra Records albums